The Beijing–Guangdong high-speed train is a high-speed train service operated by China Railway Beijing Group (CR Beijing) on Beijing–Guangzhou–Shenzhen–Hong Kong HSR in China.

History
The high-speed train services between Beijing and Guangzhou date back to 26 December 2012, when the Beijing–Zhengzhou section of the Beijing–Guangzhou–Shenzhen–Hong Kong HSR was opened.

The former G80/81 service between Beijing West and Guangzhou South had the train numbers changed to G66/69 and 2 more pairs of trains (G65/68 and G67/70) between Beijing West and Guangzhou South started services. After the adjustment, there were 3 pairs of trains operating daily between Beijing West and Guangzhou South (G65/68, G66/69 and G67/70), and 2 pairs of trains between Beijing West and Shenzhen North (G71/72 and G79/80).

(Note that G80 and G79 between Hong Kong and Beijing, via Shenzhen and Guangzhou, are staffed by CR Guangzhou, not CR Beijing)

Operations

Train G66 only stop at stations of province capitals and is thus the fastest train service from Guangzhou to Beijing, with a travelling time of 8 hours. The train is also called as the "benchmark train".

●: stop at the station
↓ or ↑: pass the station
—: out of service range
  : Benchmark train

(Note that the Hong Kong / Beijing G79 and G80 trains are "benchmark" trains too but is not listed above)

Train formation
The G66/69, G67/70 and G71/72 services are operated by 16-car CRH380AL trainsets with the formation shown below. The front and rear cars (Car 1 and 16) are for business seats together with 2+2 first class seats. Car 2 and 4 are first class car with 2+2 seating. Car 3 is for business seats only. Car 5-8 and 10-15 are for second class seats with 3+2 seating. Car 9 is the dining car. 

The G65/68 service is operated by double-headed 8-car CR400AF trainsets (16 cars). The formation is shown below.

References

China Railway passenger services
Passenger rail transport in China
Railway services introduced in 2012